The 2019 Holy Cross Crusaders football team represented the College of the Holy Cross as a member of the Patriot League during the 2019 NCAA Division I FCS football season. Led by second-year head coach Bob Chesney, Holy Cross compiled an overall record of 7–6 with a mark of 5–1 in conference play, winning the Patriot League title. The Crusaders advanced to the NCAA Division I Football Championship playoffs, where they lost in the first round to Monmouth. They played their home games at Fitton Field in Worcester, Massachusetts.

Previous season
The Crusaders finished the 2018 season 5–6, 4–2 in Patriot League play to finish in a tie for second place.

Preseason

Preseason coaches' poll
The Patriot League released their preseason coaches' poll on July 30, 2019 (voting was by conference head coaches and sports information directors). The Crusaders were picked to finish in second place, receiving 2 of 14 first-place votes.

Preseason All-Patriot League team
The Crusaders had three players selected to the preseason All-Patriot League team.

Offense

Domenic Cozier – RB

Brett Boddy – OL

Brian Foley – OL

Schedule

Game summaries

at Navy

New Hampshire

at Yale

at Syracuse

at Bucknell

at Brown

Harvard

Colgate

at Lehigh

Lafayette

at Fordham

Georgetown

FCS Playoffs
The Crusaders received an automatic bid (due to winning their conference) for the postseason tournament, with a first-round pairing against Monmouth.

at Monmouth–First Round

References

Holy Cross
Holy Cross Crusaders football seasons
Patriot League football champion seasons
Holy Cross
Holy Cross Crusaders football